Jules Maria Adolphe Henri De Bisschop (5 February 1879 – 21 December 1954) was a Belgian rower who competed in the 1900 Summer Olympics. He was a member of the Belgian club Royal Club Nautique de Gand and with his team, he won the silver medal in the men's eight.

References

External links

Jules De Bisschop's profile at databaseOlympics

1879 births
1954 deaths
Belgian male rowers
Olympic rowers of Belgium
Rowers at the 1900 Summer Olympics
Olympic silver medalists for Belgium
Flemish sportspeople
Olympic medalists in rowing
Medalists at the 1900 Summer Olympics
Royal Club Nautique de Gand rowers
European Rowing Championships medalists